Billy Green (1 January 1910 – 19 June 1978) was an  Australian rules footballer who played with St Kilda in the Victorian Football League (VFL).

Notes

External links 

1910 births
1978 deaths
Australian rules footballers from Victoria (Australia)
St Kilda Football Club players